Malcolm Luria Diamond (November 6, 1924 – December 27, 1997) was William H. Danforth Professor of Religion, Emeritus, at Princeton University.

Career
Diamond was born November 6, 1924 in New York City. During World War II, Diamond served in the U.S. Navy and was deployed to the South Pacific. He received a bachelor's degree in metallurgical engineering from Yale University in 1945 and a Ph.D. in philosophy and religion from Columbia University in 1956. He also studied at the Yale Divinity School in 1946-47 and at Trinity College, Cambridge, during 1947-48. He later earned an Ed.S. in family therapy from Seton Hall University in 1985.

A known civil rights activist, Diamond was among those to join the Freedom Riders in the South during the Civil Rights Movement. He was also an outspoken critic of war and participated in several anti-war demonstrations in the Northeast. Before being appointed to the Danforth chair at Princeton, Diamond had taught at several colleges including Sarah Lawrence College and New York University. Diamond also served on the executive committee of the American Academy of Religion. Professor Diamond died at the age of 73 after a long struggle with multiple myeloma.

Works
After joining the Princeton faculty in 1953, Professor Diamond was the author of several books on philosophy and religion including Contemporary Philosophy and Religious Thought, Martin Buber: Jewish Existentialist, and The Logic of God: Theology and Verification.

Sources
 Princeton University Obituary
 TIME on Civil Rights

1924 births
1997 deaths
Columbia University alumni
Seton Hall University alumni
Yale School of Engineering & Applied Science alumni
Yale Divinity School alumni
Sarah Lawrence College faculty
New York University faculty
Princeton University faculty
Deaths from multiple myeloma
United States Navy personnel of World War II